Stormarn was a  which, alongside Holstein and Dithmarschen, was one of the three Northern Albingian Saxon gaus.

The Gau of Stormarn lay in the southeast of Schleswig-Holstein. As well as the present county of Stormarn it also covered the territory of present-day Pinneberg, part of Steinburg, parts of Segeberg and the present land of the Hanseatic city of Hamburg north of the Elbe. The "Stormarni" were recorded in documents from the 11th century, like the Hamburg Church History by Adam of Bremen. The document refers to the Stormarni as one of the Saxon tribes.

References 

Former states and territories of Schleswig-Holstein
Carolingian counties
Holstein